Ľubomír Belko (born 4 February 2002) is a Slovak professional footballer who plays for Fortuna Liga club MŠK Žilina.

Club career

MŠK Žilina
Belko made his Fortuna Liga debut for Žilina on 8 August 2021 during a home match against FK Pohronie, in which Šošoni recorded a 3:1 win. Belko conceded the single goal from Ladji Mallé.

International career
Belko was first recognised in a senior national team nomination on 23 May 2022 Štefan Tarkovič as an alternate ahead of four UEFA Nations League fixtures against Belarus, Azerbaijan and Kazakhstan. For the same June fixtures, he was also a member of U21 team ahead of a qualifier against Malta and a friendly against Romania. In December 2022, Belko was nominated by Francesco Calzona, who joined the side in late summer, for senior national team prospective players' training camp at NTC Senec.

References

External links
 MŠK Žilina official club profile 
 
 Futbalnet profile 
 

2002 births
Living people
Sportspeople from Žilina
Slovak footballers
Slovakia youth international footballers
Slovakia under-21 international footballers
Association football goalkeepers
MŠK Žilina players
2. Liga (Slovakia) players
Slovak Super Liga players